Catherine Astrid Salome Freeman  (born 16 February 1973) is an Aboriginal Australian former sprinter, who specialised in the 400 metres event. Her personal best of 48.63 seconds currently ranks her as the ninth-fastest woman of all time, set while finishing second to Marie-José Pérec's number-four time at the 1996 Olympics. She became the Olympic champion for the women's 400 metres at the 2000 Summer Olympics, at which she lit the Olympic Flame.

Freeman was the first Australian Indigenous person to become a Commonwealth Games gold medalist at age 16 in 1990. The year 1994 was her breakthrough season. At the 1994 Commonwealth Games in Canada, Freeman won gold in both the 200 m and 400 m. She also won the silver medal at the 1996 Olympics and came first at the 1997 World Championships in the 400 m event. In 1998, Freeman took a break from running due to injury. She returned from injury in form with a first-place finish in the 400 m at the 1999 World Championships. She announced her retirement from athletics in 2003.

In 2007, she founded the Cathy Freeman Foundation.

Career

Prior to 1987
Cathy Freeman was successful in school athletics events. After 1987, she was coached by her stepfather, Bruce Barber, to various regional and national titles.

1987–1989
Following media attention, in 1987 Cathy moved to Kooralbyn International School to be coached professionally by Romanian Mike Danila, who later became a key influence throughout her career; he provided a strict training regime for the young athlete.

In 1988, she was awarded a scholarship to an exclusive girls' school, Fairholme College in Toowoomba. In a competition in 1989, Freeman ran 11.67 s in the 100 metres and Danila began to think about entering her in the Commonwealth Games Trials in Sydney.

1990–1995
In 1990, Freeman was chosen as a member of Australia's 4 × 100 m relay team for the 1990 Commonwealth Games in Auckland, New Zealand. The team won the gold medal, making Freeman the first-ever Aboriginal Commonwealth Games gold medalist, as well as one of the youngest, at 16 years old. She moved to Melbourne in 1990 after the Auckland Commonwealth Games. Shortly after moving to Melbourne, her manager Nic Bideau introduced Freeman to athletics coach Peter Fortune, who would become Freeman's coach for the rest of her career. She was then selected to represent Australia at the 1990 World Junior Championships in Athletics in Plovdiv, Bulgaria. There, she reached the semi-finals of the 100 m and placed fifth in the final of the 400 m.

Freeman competed in her second World Junior Championships in Seoul, South Korea. She competed only in the 200 m, winning the silver medal behind China's Hu Ling. Also in 1992, she traveled to her first Olympic Games in Barcelona, reaching the second round of her new specialty event, the 400 metres, and finishing 7th as part of the Australian team in the women's  relay finals. At the 1993 World Championships in Athletics Freeman competed in the 200 m, reaching the semi-finals.

1994 was Freeman's breakthrough season, when she entered into the world's elite for the first time. Competing at the 1994 Commonwealth Games in Canada, Freeman won gold in both the 200 m and 400 m. She also competed as a member of Australia's 4 × 100 m squad, winning the silver medal and as a member of the 4 × 400 m team, who finished first but were later disqualified after Freeman obstructed the Nigerian runner. During the 1994 season, Freeman took 1.3 seconds from her 400 m personal best, achieving 50.04 seconds. She also set all-time personal bests in the 100 m (11.24) and 200 m (22.25).

Although a medal favorite at the 1995 World Championships in Athletics in Sweden, Freeman finished fourth. She also reached the semi-finals of the 200 m.

1996–2003
Cathy Freeman made more progress during the 1996 season, setting many personal bests and Australian records. By this stage, she was the biggest challenger to France's Marie-José Pérec at the 1996 Olympics. She eventually took the silver medal behind Pérec, in an Australian record of 48.63 seconds. This was the fourth-fastest since the world record was set in Canberra, Australia, in 1985. Pérec's winning time of 48.25 was an Olympic record.

In 1997, Cathy Freeman won the 400 m at the World Championships in Athens, with a time of 49.77 seconds. Her only loss in the 400 m that season was in Oslo where she injured her foot.

Freeman took a break for the 1998 season, due to injury. Upon her return to the track in 1999, Freeman did not lose a single 400 m race, including at the World Championships.

Freeman also lit the torch in the 2000 Olympic Games in Sydney.

She continued to win into the 2000 season, despite Pérec's return to the track. Freeman was the home favorite for the 400 m title at the 2000 Olympics in Sydney, where she was expected to face-off with rival Pérec. This showdown never happened, as Pérec left the Games after what she described as harassment from strangers. Freeman won the Olympic title in a time of 49.11 seconds, becoming only the second Australian Aboriginal Olympic champion (the first was Freeman's  teammate Nova Peris-Kneebone who won for field hockey four years earlier in Atlanta). After the race, Freeman took a victory lap, carrying both the Aboriginal and Australian flags. This was despite unofficial flags being banned at the Olympic Games, and the Aboriginal flag, while recognised as official in Australia, not being a national flag or recognised by the International Olympic Committee. Freeman also reached the final of the 200 m, coming sixth. In honour of her gold medal win in Sydney, she represented Oceania in carrying the Olympic flag at the opening ceremonies of the next Olympics, in Salt Lake City, joining Archbishop Desmond Tutu (Africa), John Glenn (The Americas), Kazuyoshi Funaki (Asia), Lech Wałęsa (Europe), Jean-Michel Cousteau (Environment), Jean-Claude Killy (Sport), and Steven Spielberg (Culture).

Throughout her career, Freeman regularly competed in the Victorian Athletic League where she won two 400 m races at the Stawell Gift Carnival.
Freeman did not compete during the 2001 season. In 2002 she returned to the track to compete as a member of Australia's victorious  relay team at the 2002 Commonwealth Games.

Freeman announced her retirement in 2003.

Post-athletic career
Since retiring from athletics Freeman has become involved in a range of community and charitable activities. She was an Ambassador of the Australian Indigenous Education Foundation (AIEF) until 2012.

Freeman was appointed as an Ambassador for Cottage by the Sea (a children's holiday camp in Queenscliffe, Victoria), alongside celebrity chef Curtis Stone and big-wave surfer Jeff Rowley. Freeman retired from her position as Patron after 10 years in 2014.

Cathy Freeman Foundation
In 2007 Freeman founded the Cathy Freeman Foundation. The Foundation works with four remote Indigenous communities to close the gap in education between Indigenous and non-Indigenous Australian children, by offering incentives for children to attend school. It partners with the AIEF and the Brotherhood of St Laurence.

Personal life
Freeman was born in 1973 at Slade Point, Mackay, Queensland, to Norman Freeman and Cecelia Barber. Norman was born in Woorabinda of the Birri Gubba people; Cecelia was born on Palm Island in Queensland, and is of Kuku Yalanji heritage. Freeman and her brothers Gavin, Garth, and Norman were raised in Mackay and in other parts of Queensland. She also had an older sister, Anne-Marie, who was born in 1966 and died in 1990. Anne-Marie had cerebral palsy and spent much of her life in the Birribi care facility in Rockhampton.
 
Freeman attended several schools, including schools in Mackay and Coppabella, but was mostly educated at Fairholme College in Toowoomba where she attended after winning a scholarship to board there.

Freeman's parents divorced in 1978, after which her father returned to Woorabinda.

Freeman has described how she has been influenced by early experiences with racism and also by the Baháʼí Faith. She was raised a Baháʼí, and says of her faith, "I'm not a devout Baha'i but I like the prayers and I appreciate their values about the equality of all human kind."

Freeman had a long-term romantic relationship with Nick Bideau, her manager, that ended in acrimony and legal wranglings over Freeman's endorsement earnings. Freeman married Alexander "Sandy" Bodecker, a Nike executive 20 years her senior, in 1999. After her success in Sydney she took an extended break from the track to nurse Bodecker through a bout of throat cancer from May to October 2002. She announced their separation in February 2003. Later that year, Freeman began dating Australian actor Joel Edgerton whom she had initially met at the 2002 TV Week Logies. Their relationship ended in early 2005.

In October 2006, Freeman announced her engagement to Melbourne stockbroker James Murch. They married at Spray Farm on the Bellarine Peninsula on 11 April 2009. Freeman gave birth to her first child in 2011.

Media
She joined with actress Deborah Mailman on a road trip, a four-part television documentary series Going Bush (2006) where the pair set off on a journey from Broome to Arnhem Land spending time with Indigenous communities along the way.

In 2008, Freeman participated in Who Do You Think You Are? and discovered that her mother was of Chinese and English heritage as well as Aboriginal. As a result of a 1917 Queensland policy that Aboriginal people could serve in the military if they had a European parent, her paternal great-grandfather, Frank Fisher served in the 11th Light Horse Regiment during World War I.

On her right arm, the side closest to the spectators on an athletics track, she had the words "Cos I'm free" tattooed midway between her shoulder and elbow.

Competition record

International competitions

National championships

Circuit performances

Awards
Young Australian of the Year 1990
Australian of the Year 1998
Australian Sports Medal 2000
Centenary Medal 2001
Medal of the Order of Australia (OAM) 2001
In 2001, Freeman received the Olympic Order from Juan Antonio Samaranch
Laureus named Freeman Sportswoman of the Year in 2001
Arthur Ashe Courage Award 2001
Deadly Awards 2003 – Female Sportsperson of the Year
Sport Australia Hall of Fame induction in 2005
Queensland Sport Hall of Fame induction in 2009
In 2009 as part of the Q150 celebrations, Freeman was announced as one of the Q150 Icons of Queensland for her role as a "sports legend".

References

Further reading
 Freeman, Cathy (2007) Born to Run Melbourne, Penguin Books Australia. 
 
 McGregor, A. (1998) Cathy Freeman; A Journey Just Begun. Milsons Point, Random House Australia. 
 White, L. (2013) "Cathy Freeman and Australia's Indigenous Heritage: A New Beginning for an Old Nation at the Sydney 2000 Olympic Games", International Journal of Heritage Studies, Vol. 19, Issue 2, pp 153–170.
 White, L. (2010) "Gender, Race and Nation at the Sydney 2000 Olympic Games: Mediated Images of Ian Thorpe and Cathy Freeman". In L. K. Fuller (ed.) Sexual Sports Rhetoric: Global and Universal Contexts. New York: Peter Lang, pp 185–200.
 White, L. (2008) "One Athlete, One Nation, Two Flags: Cathy Freeman and Australia's Search for Aboriginal Reconciliation", Sporting Traditions, Vol. 25, Issue 2, pp 1–19.

External links

 
 
 
 
 
 Cathy Freeman at Estrella Sports Management
 The Cathy Freeman Foundation - supports Indigenous students to experience their full potential in school

1973 births
Living people
Sportspeople from Mackay, Queensland
Sportswomen from Queensland
Australian female sprinters
Olympic athletes of Australia
Olympic gold medalists for Australia
Olympic silver medalists for Australia
Indigenous Australian Olympians
Indigenous Australian track and field athletes
Olympic cauldron lighters
Athletes (track and field) at the 1992 Summer Olympics
Athletes (track and field) at the 1996 Summer Olympics
Athletes (track and field) at the 2000 Summer Olympics
Commonwealth Games gold medallists for Australia
Commonwealth Games silver medallists for Australia
Commonwealth Games medallists in athletics
Athletes (track and field) at the 1990 Commonwealth Games
Athletes (track and field) at the 1994 Commonwealth Games
Athletes (track and field) at the 2002 Commonwealth Games
World Athletics Championships athletes for Australia
World Athletics Championships medalists
Australian of the Year Award winners
Laureus World Sports Awards winners
Recipients of the Australian Sports Medal
Recipients of the Centenary Medal
Recipients of the Medal of the Order of Australia
Recipients of the Olympic Order
Sport Australia Hall of Fame inductees
Australian people of Chinese descent
Australian people of English descent
Australian Bahá'ís
Medalists at the 1996 Summer Olympics
Medalists at the 2000 Summer Olympics
Olympic gold medalists in athletics (track and field)
Olympic silver medalists in athletics (track and field)
World Athletics Indoor Championships medalists
World Athletics Championships winners
Olympic female sprinters
Australian republicans
Medallists at the 1990 Commonwealth Games
Medallists at the 1994 Commonwealth Games
Medallists at the 2002 Commonwealth Games